Lee Woo-hyung (born 2 February 1966) is a South Korean former footballer who played as midfielder and currently manager.

Career

Playing career
He played for Kookmin Bank Football Club and retired with a dissolution of the team in 1997.

Managerial career
Lee was appointed as a coach of Goyang KB in 2000 and promoted to a manager in 2004.

He started for his new post as a manager of FC Anyang in 2013.

References

External links 

1966 births
Living people
Association football forwards
South Korean footballers
South Korean football managers
Goyang KB Kookmin Bank FC players
Goyang KB Kookmin Bank FC managers
FC Anyang managers
Korea National League players
Konkuk University alumni
Expatriate football managers in China